Marwaha is a Ramgarhia/Tarkhan Sikh surname. It may refer to:

Mahip Marwaha, Indian television actor
Nikkitasha Marwaha, Indian beauty pageant
Rohan Marwaha (born 1994), Indian cricketer
Shilpi Marwaha, Indian theatre artist and activist
Vishal Marwaha (born 1976), Scottish field hockey player

See also
Vinita Marwaha Madill (born 1987), British Space Operations engineer and science communicator